The  (pl. ), occasionally assarius (pl. assarii, rendered into Greek as , assárion) was a bronze, and later copper, coin used during the Roman Republic and Roman Empire.

Republican era coinage 
The Romans replaced the usage of Greek coins, first by bronze ingots, then by disks known as the aes rude.

At about the same time a silver coin, the denarius, was also introduced. Earlier Roman silver coins had been struck on the Greek weight standards that facilitated their use in southern Italy and across the Adriatic, but all Roman coins were now on a Roman weight standard. The denarius, or 'tenner', was at first tariffed at ten asses, but in about 140 BC it was retariffed at sixteen asses. This is said to have been a result of financing the Punic Wars.

During the Republic, the as featured the bust of Janus on the obverse, and the prow of a galley on the reverse. The as was originally produced on the libral and then the reduced libral weight standard. As the weight decreased, the bronze coinage of the Republic switched from being cast to being struck. During certain periods, no asses were produced at all.

Imperial era coinage 

The as continued to be produced until the 3rd century AD. It was the lowest valued coin regularly issued during the Roman Empire, with semis and  being produced infrequently, and then not at all sometime after the reign of Marcus Aurelius. The last as seems to have been produced by Aurelian between 270 and 275 and at the beginning of the reign of Diocletian.

Byzantine coinage 
The as, under its Greek name assarion, was re-established by the Emperor Andronikos II Palaiologos (r. 1282–1328) and minted in great quantities in the first half of the 14th century. It was a low-quality flat copper coin, weighing ca. 3–4 grams and forming the lowest denomination of contemporary Byzantine coinage, being exchanged at 1:768 to the gold hyperpyron. It appears that the designs on the assarion changed annually, hence they display great variations. The assarion was replaced in 1367 by two other copper denominations, the tournesion and the follaro.

See also 

 Roman currency
 Roman finance

References 

Coins of ancient Rome